The 2023 China League One will be the 20th season of the China League One, the second tier of the Chinese football league pyramid, since its establishment in 2004.

Clubs

Club changes

To League One
Teams relegated from 2022 Chinese Super League
Guangzhou
Hebei

Teams promoted from 2022 China League Two
Jinan Xingzhou
Dandong Tengyue
Yanbian Longding

From League One
Teams promoted to 2023 Chinese Super League
Kunshan
Qingdao Hainiu
Nantong Zhiyun

Teams relegated to 2023 China League Two
Beijing BIT

Dissolved entries
Wuhan Yangtze River
Xinjiang Tianshan Leopard

Name changes
Qingdao Youth Island F.C. changed their name to Qingdao West Coast in March 2023.
Jiangxi Beidamen F.C. changed their name to Jiangxi Lushan in March 2023.

Clubs information

Clubs locations

Managerial changes

Foreign players
Players name in bold indicates the player is registered during the mid-season transfer window.

 For Hong Kong, Macau, or Taiwanese players, if they are non-naturalized and were registered as professional footballers in Hong Kong's, Macau's, or Chinese Taipei's football association for the first time, they are recognized as native players. Otherwise they are recognized as foreign players.

League table

Results

Positions by round

Results by match played

Goalscorers

Notes

References

External links

China League One seasons
2
China